Paul Rodriguez (born January 19, 1955) is a Mexican-American actor and stand-up comedian.

Early life
Paul Rodriguez was born in Culiacan, Sinaloa, to Mexican agriculture ranchers. His family migrated to Compton, California, where Rodriguez enlisted in the United States Air Force and was stationed in Iceland and in Duluth, Minnesota. Rodriguez was first assigned to Lackland AFB after completing training at Shepard AFB, both in Texas. A1C Rodriguez worked in a Communications Center as a 29130 and had a Top Secret security clearance. He won Tops in Blue.

Career

Television
Rodriguez first appeared in a.k.a. Pablo, a 1984 sitcom produced by Embassy Television for ABC, but the show was canceled after six episodes. He was regular cast member of the 1988 sitcom Trial and Error, but it was cancelled after only three episodes aired. Later in the same year he replaced Bob Eubanks as host of The Newlywed Game for a season (which was renamed The Newlywed Game Starring Paul Rodriguez and also during his tenure as host, the doo-wop hit "The Book of Love" (The Monotones song) by The Monotones was used as its theme song). El Show de Paul Rodriguez was on Univision from March 2, 1990, to January 1, 1993.

From 2010 to 2011, Rodriguez hosted two seasons and 40 episodes of the MTV Tr3́s comedy home video series Mis Videos Locos. The reality show features video footage of Latino people from various countries who are filmed by devices like surveillance cameras and mobile phones.

Film 
Rodriguez has appeared in several feature films, such as The Whoopee Boys with Michael O'Keefe, Denholm Elliott and Marsha Warfield, Blood Work with Clint Eastwood, D.C. Cab, Born in East L.A., Tortilla Soup, Rat Race, and Ali, and has also performed voiceover roles for King of the Hill, Dora the Explorer, and Beverly Hills Chihuahua. Rodriguez has worked in other roles in the film industry: he directed and starred in the film A Million to Juan, and he produced and appeared in the 2002 comedy film The Original Latin Kings of Comedy.

In 2009, the stand up Comedy Special Paul Rodriguez: Comedy Rehab, produced and hosted by Rodriguez was released. Paul Rodriguez: Just for the Record, which documents a live performance was released in 2011.

In May 2021, Rodriguez made his debut on A Million Little Things as Gary's Dad. He re-united with Jeff Valdez, creator of the Latino Laugh Festival as host of the second annual HA! Comedy Festival, which will air on HBO Max. According to Deadline Hollywood, he is expected to appear in the dark comedy feature film The Immortalist which was scheduled to be released in November 2021. It also features Franco Nero, Sherilyn Fenn, Aries Spears, and Jeff DuJardin.

Awards

In 2004 Comedy Central ranked him at No. 74 on its list of the "100 Greatest Standups of all Time."

Rodriguez was acknowledged with the "Humanitarian of the Year Award" by the City of Fresno for his work in the area of water conservation.

Company owner

Rodriguez is a part-owner of the Laugh Factory comedy venue in Hollywood, Los Angeles, California, U.S., where comedian/actor Michael Richards was filmed in a highly publicized on-stage rant against two black male hecklers. When asked about Richards's repeated use of the word "Nigger", Rodriguez said, "Once the word comes out of your mouth and you don't happen to be African American, then you have a whole lot of explaining to do." Rodriguez also has an interest in farming and owns operations in California's Central Valley.

Charity work

Rodriguez is known for his charity work, and many of his comedy specials cover serious issues that are of concern to the Latino community. He has performed for several Comic Relief charity specials and in 1995 he performed a television special live from San Quentin State Prison. He is the chairman of the California Latino Water Coalition, a group that campaigns to draw attention to California's dire water situation and was influential in enacting the California Water Bond Measure.

Politics

Rodriguez has been a vocal and active supporter of the Republican Party. In 2010 he endorsed Republican Meg Whitman during her campaign against Jerry Brown to become governor of California. Rodriguez calls himself a "closeted Republican" but voted for Barack Obama in 2008. He endorsed Republican candidate Mitt Romney during the 2012 presidential election and recorded a radio promotion in Spanish for Romney's campaign. He also collaborated with former governor of California Arnold Schwarzenegger as part of his work with the California Latino Water Coalition. In 2018, Rodriguez announced that he supports many of the policies of Donald Trump.

Personal life

Rodriguez's son Paul Rodriguez Jr. is a professional skateboarder (also known as "P-Rod").

Discography

1986: You're in America now, speak Spanish
1997: Cheese 'n' macaroni

Filmography

Awards and nominations

ALMA Award
1999: Nominated, "Outstanding Performance by an Individual or Act in a Variety or Comedy Special"Comic Relief VIII
2002: Nominated, "Outstanding Supporting Actor in a Motion Picture"Tortilla Soup

Imagen Awards
2009: Nominated, "Best Supporting Actor/Feature Film"Beverly Hills Chihuahua

NCLR Bravo Awards
1996: Won, "Outstanding Performance by a Male in a Variety or Music Series/Special"Latino Laugh Festival

References

External links

1955 births
Living people
American male comedians
American male film actors
American male television actors
American male voice actors
American male rappers
American male singers
American game show hosts
Mexican male comedians
Mexican male film actors
Mexican male television actors
Mexican male voice actors
Mexican game show hosts
Mexican male rappers
Mexican male singers
California Republicans
Hispanic and Latino American male actors
Hispanic and Latino American rappers
Male actors from Sinaloa
United States Air Force airmen
People from Culiacán
Virgin Records artists
Male actors from Los Angeles
Rappers from Los Angeles
Mexican emigrants to the United States
Comedians from California
Rappers from California
Singers from California
20th-century American comedians
21st-century American comedians
Naturalized citizens of the United States